Kuraim District (Baxše Kurâyim) is in Nir County, Ardabil province, Iran. At the 2006 census, its population was 10,966 in 2,368 households. The following census in 2011 counted 10,308 people in 2,865 households. At the latest census in 2016, the district had 8,674 inhabitants living in 2,644 households.

References 

Nir County

Districts of Ardabil Province

Populated places in Ardabil Province

Populated places in Nir County